Pachygnatha zappa is a spider named after musician Frank Zappa because of its unique markings which resemble his famous moustache.

Belgian biologists Robert Bosmans and Jan Bosselaers, from the Rijksuniversiteit Gent organized two expeditions to Mount Cameroon and neighbouring ranges. In 1994 (in Zoologica Scripta, Vol. 23, No. 4, pages 325–352) they introduced the species they named Pachygnatha zappa.

See also
List of organisms named after famous people (born 1900–1949)

External links
Pachygnatha zappa
Arachnology.org

Tetragnathidae
Frank Zappa
Spiders of Africa
Spiders described in 1994